Wat Suk Wararm is a Buddhist temple (wat) in Don Tum District of Nakhon Pathom, Thailand.  Also known as Wat Don Ruak, it is one of Don Ruak's temples.

Location 

Village No.1, Don Ruak Sub-district, Don Tum District, Nakhon Pathom Province, Thailand

List of Abbots (Buddhism) of Wat Suk Wararam

Buddhist temples in Nakhon Pathom Province